Michael Dasaro (died November 13, 1993) was an American businessman who was murdered in Moscow, Russia near the American Embassy at the time. Dasaro was the first American citizen with direct ties to the embassy to be murdered since perestroika. President Boris Yeltsin gave him the title of "economic counselor".

Private life
After his death, the Moscow press stated that he was homosexual and frequented gay bars.

Career
Dasaro graduated from Harvard.

In the late 1980s Dasaro was a contract employee in the economics section of the U.S. embassy in Moscow.

Dasaro worked for the International Finance Corporation, the commercial arm of the World Bank, on privatization projects for Russian industrial firms.

Dasaro worked with Ernst and Young.

See also
 Shock Doctrine

Notes

Harvard University alumni
1993 deaths
People murdered in Moscow

Year of birth missing